The geomagnetic poles are antipodal points where the axis of a best-fitting dipole intersects the surface of Earth. This theoretical dipole is equivalent to a powerful bar magnet at the center of Earth, and comes closer than any other point dipole model to describing the magnetic field observed at Earth's surface. In contrast, the magnetic poles of the actual Earth are not antipodal; that is, the line on which they lie does not pass through Earth's center.

Owing to motion of fluid in the Earth's outer core, the actual magnetic poles are constantly moving (secular variation). However, over thousands of years, their direction averages to the Earth's rotation axis. On the order of once every half a million years, the poles reverse (i.e., north switches place with south) although the time frame of this switching can be anywhere from every 10 thousand years to every 50 million years.

Although the geomagnetic pole is only theoretical and cannot be located directly, it arguably is of more practical relevance than the magnetic (dip) pole. This is because the poles describe a great deal about the Earth's magnetic field, determining for example where auroras can be observed. The dipole model of the Earth's magnetic field consists of the location of geomagnetic poles and the dipole moment, which describes the strength of the field.

Definition
As a first-order approximation, the Earth's magnetic field can be modeled as a simple dipole (like a bar magnet), tilted about 9.6° with respect to the Earth's rotation axis (which defines the Geographic North and Geographic South Poles) and centered at the Earth's center. The North and South Geomagnetic Poles are the antipodal points where the axis of this theoretical dipole intersects the Earth's surface. Thus, unlike the actual magnetic poles, the geomagnetic poles always have an equal degree of latitude and supplementary degrees of longitude respectively (2017: Lat. 80.5°N, 80.5°S; Long. 72.8°W, 107.2°E). If the Earth's magnetic field were a perfect dipole, the field lines would be vertical to the surface at the Geomagnetic Poles, and they would align with the North and South magnetic poles, with the North Magnetic Pole at the south end of dipole. However, the approximation is imperfect, and so the Magnetic and Geomagnetic Poles lie some distance apart.

Location
Like the North Magnetic Pole, the North Geomagnetic Pole attracts the north pole of a bar magnet and so is in a physical sense actually a magnetic south pole. It is the center of the 'open' magnetic field lines which connect to the interplanetary magnetic field and provide a direct route for the solar wind to reach the ionosphere.

The South Geomagnetic Pole is the point where the axis of this best-fitting tilted dipole intersects the Earth's surface in the southern hemisphere.

Because the Earth's actual magnetic field is not an exact dipole, the (calculated) North and South Geomagnetic Poles do not coincide with the North and South Magnetic Poles. If the Earth's magnetic fields were exactly dipolar, the north pole of a magnetic compass needle would point directly at the North Geomagnetic Pole. In practice, it does not because the geomagnetic field that originates in the core has a more complex non-dipolar part, and magnetic anomalies in the Earth's crust also contribute to the local field. 

The locations of geomagnetic poles are calculated by a statistical fit to measurements of the Earth's field by satellites and in geomagnetic observatories. This can be the International Geomagnetic Reference Field (covering a wide time-span in history) or the U.S. World Magnetic Model (only covering a five-year period).

Movement
The geomagnetic poles move over time because the geomagnetic field is produced by motion of the molten iron alloys in the Earth's outer core. (See geodynamo.) Over the past 150 years, the poles have moved westward at a rate of 0.05° to 0.1° per year and closer to the true poles at 0.01° per year.

Over several thousand years, the average location of the geomagnetic poles coincides with the geographical poles. Paleomagnetists have long relied on the geocentric axial dipole (GAD) hypothesis, which states that — aside from during geomagnetic reversals — the time-averaged position of the geomagnetic poles has always coincided with the geographic poles. There is considerable paleomagnetic evidence supporting this hypothesis.

Geomagnetic reversal

Over the life of the Earth, the orientation of Earth's magnetic field has reversed many times, with geomagnetic north becoming geomagnetic south and vice versa – an event known as a geomagnetic reversal. Evidence of geomagnetic reversals can be seen at mid-ocean ridges where tectonic plates move apart. As magma seeps out of the mantle and solidifies to become new ocean floor, the magnetic minerals in it are magnetized in the direction of the magnetic field. The study of this remanence is called palaeomagnetism. Thus, starting at the most recently formed ocean floor, one can read out the direction of the magnetic field in previous times as one moves farther away to older ocean floor.

See also
 Earth's magnetic field

Notes

References

External links
NOAA—Geomagnetic-related web resources

Geomagnetism
Orientation (geometry)